Percy Mills may refer to:

Percy Mills, 1st Viscount Mills (1890–1968), English politician
Percy Mills (cricketer) (1879–1950), English cricketer
Percy Mills (footballer) (1909–1967), English footballer
Percy Mills (weightlifter)